"On oublie le reste" (English: We Forget the Rest) is a song by French singer-songwriter Jenifer featuring Australian singer Kylie Minogue. It was released on 9 October 2019, as the third overall single and first from the deluxe edition of Jenifer's 2018 studio album Nouvelle Page. It contains an interpolation of Minogue's 2001 single, "Can't Get You Out of My Head".

Music video
The music video was released on 6 December 2019 and has Jenifer having fun under the neon lights in the colourful video, mixing retro and futurism and dances to the sound of the famous "la la la" from "Can't Get You Out of My Head". Minogue does not appear in the video.

Charts

References

2019 singles
2019 songs
Jenifer (singer) songs
Kylie Minogue songs
Songs written by Cathy Dennis
Songs written by Rob Davis (musician)
French pop songs